Gezel is a hardware description language, allowing the implementation of a Finite State Machine + Datapath (FSMD) model. The tools included in Gezel allows for simulation, cosimulation as well as compiling into VHDL code. It is possible to extend Gezel through library-blocks written in C++.

A Hello World Program
dp helloWorld(){
   always {
      $display("Hello World");
   }
}

system S {
   helloWorld;
}

References

Hardware description languages